Aoulef is a town and commune and capital of Aoulef District, in Adrar Province, south-central Algeria. According to the 2008 census it has a population of 21,723, up from 15,229 in 1998, with an annual growth rate of 3.7%.

Geography 

The oasis is a part of the Tidikelt region of the central Sahara that extends from central eastern Adrar Province (where Aoulef is located) to northeast Tamanrasset Province around In Salah. The oases in this region are sparser than in the Tuat and Gourara regions in which most of the population of Adrar Province live, but there are still a number of towns such as Timokten, Akabli, Tit and In Ghar. The nearby land is mostly flat aside from some small hills to the east; however further north the land rises to the Tademaït plateau.

Climate 

Aoulef has a hot desert climate (Köppen climate classification BWh), with long, extremely hot summers and short, very warm winters. Daytime temperatures are known to consistently approach 50 °C (122 °F) in summer and nighttime temperatures routinely remain above 30 °C (86 °F). Average annual rainfall is extremely low, with only 10 mm (0.39 in). The sky is nearly always clear throughout the year and cloudy days are extremely rare. Aoulef is often quoted as one of the hottest spots worldwide.

<div style="width:85%;">

Transportation 

Aoulef lies on the N52 national highway, which connects it to Reggane and eventually Adrar to the west and In Salah to the east. A provincial road connects the town to Timokten, located just to the northwest of Aoulef.

Education

11.1% of the population has a tertiary education (the highest rate in the province), and another 22.4% has completed secondary education. The overall literacy rate is 84.6% (second highest in the province), and is 90.9% among males (second highest in the province) and 77.1% among females.

Localities
As of 1984, the commune was composed of eight localities:

Ouamanat
Takaraft
Djedid
Gasbet Bellal
Gasbet Maïkhaf
Roukina
Zaouit Heinoume
Habbadat

References 

Neighbouring towns and cities

Communes of Adrar Province